Steve O'Donnell is an American television writer. His credits include Late Night with David Letterman, The Simpsons, Seinfeld, and The Chris Rock Show.

Biography

Steve O'Donnell was born in Cleveland, Ohio, and graduated with an A.B. degree from Harvard College in 1976. He also completed graduate studies in American history at Columbia University and the University of North Carolina at Chapel Hill.

Career

O'Donnell worked on Letterman nearly since the show's inception. The Top Ten List was originally created during O'Donnell's time as head writer, and lists were written in collaboration with other staff writers on the show. According to O'Donnell, the Top Ten List was an "almost simultaneous inspiration arriving from staffers Jim Downey, Randy Cohen and Robert "Morty" Morton — largely prompted by the ridiculous 'eligible bachelor' lists in a local New York paper that included the 84-year-old Bill Paley. 'Why, we can put such nonsense together ourselves!' we exclaimed. And we did." He later co-authored several of the Top-ten books based on the show. During Letterman's final season, O'Donnell wrote and spoke about his time as head writer on the show, and compiled his own list of the show's "top ten" moments for The New York Times.

O'Donnell was later the head writer of Jimmy Kimmel Live!, from the show's debut in January 2003 until 2008. He occasionally appeared front of the camera in bits for the show as well.

In addition to his tenure as head writer of Letterman and Kimmel, O'Donnell worked as a writer and producer on The Bonnie Hunt Show, The Dana Carvey Show, Norm Macdonald Live, and Why? with Hannibal Buress on Comedy Central. He continued his work with Norm Macdonald as a writer on Norm Macdonald Has a Show for Netflix.

He has appeared in additional brief on-screen roles in Strangers With Candy and The Sarah Silverman Program.

He won Primetime Emmy Awards in the "Outstanding Writing in a Variety or Music Program" category on four occasions: for Late Night with David Letterman in 1984, 1986, and 1987 and for The Chris Rock Show in 1998.

In 2017, the Writers Guild of America presented O'Donnell with the Herb Sargent Award for Comedy Excellence. A video appearance from recently retired David Letterman was part of O'Donnell's introduction.

Personal life

Steve is the identical twin of Mark O'Donnell, the Tony Award-winning co-writer of the Broadway musical Hairspray who died on August 6, 2012. Steve supported his brother by encouraging California voters to vote no on Prop. 8 in 2008.

Simpsons Episodes Written by O'Donnell
All Singing, All Dancing
The Joy of Sect

Seinfeld Episodes Written by O'Donnell
The Pothole
The Checks

Space Ghost: Coast to Coast Episodes Written by O'Donnell
Hungry
Late Show

References

External links
 

American television writers
American male screenwriters
American male television writers
The Harvard Lampoon alumni
Harvard College alumni
Emmy Award winners
Columbia Graduate School of Arts and Sciences alumni
University of North Carolina at Chapel Hill alumni
Living people
Writers from Cleveland
American twins
Identical twins
Screenwriters from Ohio
1954 births